Batteux is a surname. Notable people with the surname include:

 Albert Batteux (1919–2003), French footballer and manager
 Charles Batteux (1713–1780), French philosopher and writer on aesthetics
 Joël Batteux (1943–2021), French politician

French-language surnames